Alessandro Pinheiro Martins (1983 – December 6, 2005), known as just Alessandro, was a Brazilian football (soccer) player. He was born in São Luís, Maranhão.

He played as a defensive midfielder for Ferroviário, of Fortaleza, Ceará since 2004. He has also played for Santos, alongside Robinho, URT, Mamoré, Campinense, and Boa Viagem.

He died on December 6, 2005, of a heart attack, after a physical indisposition followed by a faint, during a training at Vila Olímpica Elzir Cabral. He had suffered from similar health problems during other trainings sessions, a week before his death.

He played his last match in November, against Ferroviário's rival Ceará at Estádio Presidente Vargas.

He left a wife and two children, and was buried in São Luís.

References

Jogador do Ferroviário-CE morre durante treino - Folha Online (retrieved on December 6, 2005)
Triste acontecimento no treino coral - Ferroviário Official Website (retrieved on December 6, 2005)
Alessandro participou do Clássico contra o Ceará, em novembro - Ferroviário Official Website (retrieved on December 6, 2005)
Jogador maranhense morre durante treino do Ferroviário-CE - Yahoo! Notícias (retrieved on December 6, 2005)

1983 births
2005 deaths
Brazilian footballers
Ferroviário Atlético Clube (CE) players
Santos FC players
Campinense Clube players
People from São Luís, Maranhão
Association football midfielders
Sportspeople from Maranhão